Finis Homer "Boosky" Prendergast, Jr. (April 20, 1893 – June 3, 1975) was a college football player and high school football coach.

Playing career

Auburn University
Prendergast was a prominent running back for Mike Donahue's Auburn Tigers football team of Auburn University from 1913 to 1916. He also punted.

1915
He was selected All-Southern in 1915.

1916
Prendergast was selected All-Southern again in 1916.

Coaching career
Homer Prendergast began as head coach at Fair Park High School in Shreveport, Louisiana in 1931 and coached until 1955.

In his twenty-three years as head coach, he had a 154–78–13 (.655) record and won a LHSAA State Championship in 1952.

References

1893 births
1975 deaths
American football halfbacks
American football quarterbacks
Auburn Tigers football players
All-Southern college football players
High school football coaches in Louisiana
Players of American football from Shreveport, Louisiana
People from Marshall, Texas
Players of American football from Texas